Gadai Sarai is a Gram panchayat in Hajipur,  vaishali District, Bihar.

Geography
This panchayat is located at

panchayat office
Kisan Vivah bhawan Akilabad

Nearest City/Town
Hajipur (Distance 5 km)

Nearest major road highway or river
SH 74 (State highway 74)

Compass

Villages in panchayat
There are  villages in this panchayat

References

Gram panchayats in Bihar
Villages in Vaishali district
Vaishali district
Hajipur
Caravanserais in India